Thamusida was a Berber, Carthaginian, and Roman river port that was near the present-day towns of Kénitra and Mehdia in Morocco. Under the Roman Empire, it formed a part of the province of Mauretania Tingitana.

Name
Because the original name intended a hard, breathy /tʰ/ sound instead of the usual English /θ/, the same name is also sometimes written Tamusida or Tamusia. It is probably identical with the Thymiateria mentioned by Pseudo-Scylax.

History
The city originally was a Berber settlement. It issued its own bronze coins. Some Punic inscriptions were found in the site.

It was occupied by Romans in the first years of Augustus' rule. There were a military camp and a nearby little city, until Claudius enlarged Thamusida. Under the Antonines, a temple was built to worship Venus. Later the settlement grew progressively, and by the end of the second century or the early third century, it was surrounded by a wall that included a total area of about 15 hectares.

In the third century, Thamusida become a mostly Christian city with a population of nearly 7,000 inhabitants. The site was abandoned around AD285, when Diocletian moved the Roman limes of Mauretania Tingitana to the north, near Lixus. There were some inhabitantsaccording to recent archeological discoveriesin Thamusida for another century after the Roman abandonment. But with the Vandal invasion, the city disappeared around AD425.

Modern archaeological site
The site was excavated from 1913 by the French, then 1959 to 1962 and since 1998. Many items found in Thamusida are today on display at the Rabat Archaeological Museum. Excavations have unearthed the walls of the docks and baths.

References

Citations

Bibliography
 .
 .
 .
 .

See also

 Iulia Valentia Banasa
 Iulia Constantia Zilil
 Iulia Campestris Babba
 Tamuda
 Tingis
 Lixus
 Sala Colonia
 Volubilis
 Roman 'Coloniae' in Berber Africa
 Christian Berbers
 Mauretania Tingitana

External Links 

 Images of Thamusida in Manar al-Athar digital heritage photo archive resource

Phoenician colonies in Morocco
Mauretania Tingitana
Roman towns and cities in Morocco
Archaeological sites in Morocco
Buildings and structures in Rabat-Salé-Kénitra
Roman towns and cities in Mauretania Tingitana